Hilton is a given name.

 G. Hilton Scribner, American lawyer and politician
 Hilton Als, New Yorker critic
 Hilton Armstrong (born 1984), American Basketball Player
 Hilton Cheong-Leen, chairman and the founder of the Hong Kong Civic Association
 Hilton Crowther, former British chairman of Huddersfield Town and, subsequently, Leeds United
 Hilton Dawson, British Labour Party member of Parliament 
 Hilton Delaney, Australian rugby league player
 Hilton Edwards, Irish actor and theatrical producer
 Hilton Jefferson, American jazz alto saxophonist
 Hilton Kidd (1922–2011), Australian rugby league footballer
 Hilton Koch, furniture dealer and store owner in Houston, Texas
 Hilton Kramer, U.S. art critic and cultural commentator
 Hilton McConnico, American designer and artist
 Hilton McRae, Scottish actor
 Hilton Philipson, politician in the United Kingdom
 Hilton Ruiz, Puerto Rican-American jazz pianist
 Hilton Schleman, English author
 Hilton Smith, American right-handed pitcher in Negro league baseball
 Hilton Valentine, British musician, who was an original guitarist in The Animals
 Hilton Wick, member of the Vermont State Senate
 Hilton Young, 1st Baron Kennet, British politician and writer
 Hylton Ackerman, former South African first class cricketer
 Hylton Deon Ackerman, South African cricketer
 Hylton Murray-Philipson, Conservative Party politician in the United Kingdom
 Hylton Philipson, English cricketer
 John Hilton Grace, British mathematician
 R. D. Hilton Smith, British librarian and once head of the Toronto Public Library